Sanguisorba obtusa, the Japanese burnet, is a species of flowering plant in the family Rosaceae, native to Japan (Honshu).

In cultivation it can tolerate a range of conditions in sun or partial shade, with moist soil.

References

obtusa
Flora of Japan